The Lancaster Eagle-Gazette is a daily newspaper based in Lancaster, Ohio in the United States and founded in 1936. Before 1936, it was known as Lancaster Daily Eagle (1890–1936). The newspaper has a daily circulation of 6,041 copies and a Sunday circulation of 8,304 copies. The Sunday version is also known with its alternative name Sunday Eagle Gazette. The newspaper is owned by Gannett.

References

External links

Official website
Gannett subsidiary profile of the Lancaster Eagle-Gazette

Newspapers published in Ohio
Fairfield County, Ohio
Gannett publications
Publications established in 1936
1936 establishments in Ohio